Tria Mera are a heavy metal band from Brisbane, Australia. Officially formed in 2010, the group consists of guitarists Juz Cook and Ian Konrad, bassist Mike Radeck, and drummer Matt McRae. The band name is Greek for "Three Day", though referred to commonly as "Third Day", as it appears in the movie White Noise 2: The White Light. Tria Mera's musical style is heavy metal, but has been compared to the styles of modern European metal due to the melodicism found throughout their music.

Since its formation, Tria Mera have released 2 EPs, played several local festivals (including Australia's major heavy metal festival Soundwave Festival headlined by Iron Maiden), and won a QMusic Award for their song "A Burning Horizon".

History

Formation and early days (2006–2009)

The formation of Tria Mera goes back to 2006, where guitarist Juz Cook and drummer Matt McRae started jamming together in Cairns, Australia. After many months of playing together, they had a full lineup and setlist, mostly metal covers, ready to hit the local live scene under the name Deadrise. They played 3 shows and were featured on Channel 9 Local News before Juz was offered to join Echoed Silence, an already established band.

While Echoed Silence was Juz's new full-time band, he and Matt continued to jam and write on the side, later pulling together the metal cover band they started for a few more shows. Eventually it became evident that to make it anywhere in the industry they would need to relocate to a bigger city. Matt moved to Brisbane in 2008, and Juz left Echoed Silence and soon followed in early 2009. 

There were many months of rehearsing new material before they found any new bandmates. Scott Moss, formerly of Brisbane metal band Minus Life, became the band's first frontman. Shortly followed by Mike Radeck on bass, and Ian Konrad on guitar. The lineup was finalised in April, 2010, officially named Tria Mera, the name that the project was given on Myspace by Juz in 2008.

Six months of rehearsals followed before the band started tracking their debut EP in September with Ean Redman. The self-titled EP featured four songs; A Burning Horizon, Demonic Shadows, Blind By Reality and The Realm Beneath Us.

First live shows and achievements (2010–2011)

Before hitting the live scene, Tria Mera played a private house party to celebrate Scott and Ian's birthdays. The band's first public show was played on 26 November 2010, supporting the Australian band Lord. The band had pulled the majority of the crowd using the show as a chance to launch their debut EP and break into the local scene.

Their efforts were recognised when JJJ stumbled across the band on their Unearthed website, hand-selecting Tria Mera to play the main stage at the Brisbane leg of the Soundwave Festival alongside Iron Maiden, Queens of the Stone Age, One Day as a Lion, Slash, Thirty Seconds to Mars, Bullet for my Valentine, Stone Sour, Primus, Social Distortion, Feeder and MXPX/The Ataris. Also performing at the festival were Slayer, Dimmu Borgir, Murderdolls, Devildriver, Sevendust and Rob Zombie. 

Performing at Soundwave opened up doors for Tria Mera, allowing them the opportunity to draw bigger crowds to local shows and build their reputation as a live band breaking out of the scene.

In June 2011, original vocalist Scott Moss announced he was leaving Tria Mera due to ever-growing family and work commitments. The next day, the band began advertising the vacant frontman position and later organised one final farewell show, which was held in August.

The success of the EP continued almost a year after its release when the band were nominated, and then won, a Queensland Music Award for their song "A Burning Horizon". The award was presented by Costa Zouliou, a former Triple J radio announcer. This helped to keep momentum while the band continued searching for a new frontman.

Members

Current
Ben Davis – Vocals (since 2013)
Juz Cook – Lead Guitar (since 2006)
Ian Konrad – Rhythm Guitar (since 2010)
Mike Radeck – Bass Guitar (since 2010)
Matt McRae – Drums (since 2006)

Former
 Scott Moss – Vocals (2009–2011)

Discography

Extended plays

Awards

Queensland Music Awards
The Queensland Music Awards (previously known as Q Song Awards) are annual awards celebrating Queensland, Australia's brightest emerging artists and established legends. They commenced in 2006.

 (wins only)
|-
| 2011
| "A Burning Horizon"
| Heavy Song of the Year
| 
|-
|}

Sources

Australian heavy metal musical groups